Road protest may be synonymous with highway revolts. It may also refer to:

Fukushima incident (1882)
1960s–1970s US Freeway and expressway revolts
1990s Road protest in the United Kingdom
Dongas road protest group
Twyford Down (1991/1992)
M11 link road protest (1993/1994)
Newbury bypass (1996)
Rimrose Valley#Highway proposals (2017)
M3 motorway (Ireland) (2007)
Reclaim the Streets

See also
:Category:Anti-road protest
Direct action